Belmont is a town in Saint John Parish, Antigua and Barbuda.

History

Belmont's Estate 
The initial owner, Lt. Col. Bastian Baijer, received 500 acres in the St. John's Division from the governor at the time. Governor Keynell also gave him an extra 18 acres, and he also acquired 728 acres in the Popeshead Division and an additional 140 acres. St. John's had "ran out" 25 feet of the Colonel's south side property, which he had possessed since April 11, 1688, according to a surveyor. His attorney, W. Hinde, Esq., demonstrated that Robert Hollingworth had given him the land.

The senior John Otto Baijer was baptized in St. John's in 1703 and went on to acquire Belmont, Otto's Estate (#16), Five Islands (#31), and Cooke's Estate (#26) as well as other properties. Afterwards, Daniel Burr Garling purchased Otto's and Belmont.

Belmont got a £2,386 legacy award from the British Parliament for freeing 160 slaves. William Musgrave, William Shand, and Chles Wollaston received the honors.

The estates of Admiral Tollemach (Weatherill's #5), Gambles (#14), Delaps (#137), and other properties were managed by William Bertie Wolseley (d. 1881). Bertie lived at Weatherill's for a while before relocating to Belmont/in Murray's 1828. In 1835, he may have held property and got payment of £159 for freeing 11 slaves. 

The 1941 sugar crop yielded, from 200 acres cultivated by peasants on the Belmont/Estate, Murray's was estimated at 813 tons; 569 tons of sugarcane were delivered.

Demographics 
Belmont has two enumeration districts.

 33401  Belmont_1 
 33402  Belmont_2

Census Data 
Source:

References 

Saint John Parish, Antigua and Barbuda
Populated places in Antigua and Barbuda